Mahmud Aghli (also Romanized as Maḩmūd Āghlī; also known as Maḩmūd Āghol) is a village in Chaybasar-e Jonubi Rural District, in the Central District of Maku County, West Azerbaijan Province, Iran. At the 2006 census, its population was 76, in 17 families.

References 

Populated places in Maku County